Modjo is the only album by French house duo Modjo. It was released on 18 September 2001 by MCA Records.

Track listing

Samples used 

 "Chillin'" contains several samples from "Le Freak" by Chic.
 "Lady (Hear Me Tonight)" contains several samples from "Soup for One" by Chic.
 "Music Takes You Back" contains several samples from "Have You Ever Seen the Rain?" by Boney M. (uncredited).
 "Rollercoaster" contains samples from "Give Me Love" by Cerrone.
 "On Fire" contains samples from "Rocket in the Pocket" by Cerrone.

Personnel 
Adopted from Modjo liner notes:

 Modjo – writers, production, performers, mastering
 Hervé Bordes – engineer, mixing
 Matthias Leullier – management
 Mandy Parnell – mastering
 Fabrice Destagnol – album cover painting, illustration, photography

Charts

Remix album 

In 2013, the album was remastered and released on streaming services, alongside a digital remix album titled Modjo (Remixes). This album contains remixes of Modjo tracks from Harry "Choo Choo" Romero (track 5, 6), Roy Davis Jr. (track 7, 8), Armand van Helden (track 25, 26), and others.

References

2001 debut albums
French house albums
Modjo albums